Cytoskeleton-associated protein 5 is a microtubule-associated protein that in humans is encoded by the CKAP5 gene. It is the homolog of the Xenopus protein XMAP215 and is also known as ch-Tog.

It has at least two distinct roles in spindle formation: it protects kinetochore microtubules from depolymerization by MCAK (KIF2C), and ch-Tog plays an essential role in centrosomal microtubule assembly, a function independent of MCAK activity.

Interactions 

CKAP5 has been shown to interact with TACC1.

References

External links

Further reading